Alucita proseni is a moth of the family Alucitidae. It is found in Argentina, specifically the province of Jujuy.

The larvae possibly feed on the Tecoma species of shrub.

References

Moths described in 1951
Alucitidae
Moths of South America